Balogun is a  title of the Yoruba language of Nigeria which means "Warlord" or roughly translated to "meet at war".

Given name
Balogun Yakub Abiodun (born 1951), Nigerian economist and public administrator

Surname
Ayodeji Balogun (born 1983), Nigerian businessperson
Fathia Balogun (born 1969), Nigerian actress, filmmaker, producer and director 
Fausat Balogun (born 1959), Nigerian actress 
Femi Balogun (born 1992), Nigerian football winger 
Folarin Balogun (born 2001), English football player
Jeffrey Lawal-Balogun (born 1986), British track athlete 
Lekan Balogun (born 1973), Nigerian dramatist and theatre director 
Leon Balogun (born 1988), German-born Nigerian football defender 
Mahmood Ali-Balogun, Nigerian filmmaker
Mike Balogun (born 1983), American football linebacker 
Mustafa Adebayo Balogun (born 1947), Nigerian public administrator 
Ola Balogun (born 1945), Nigerian filmmaker and scriptwriter 
Oluwafemi Olaiya Balogun (born 1953), Nigerian public administrator
Saidu Ayodele Balogun, Nigerian general and public administrator
Saheed Balogun (born 1967), Nigerian actor, filmmaker, director and producer
Subomi Balogun (born 1934), Nigerian banker and philanthropist 
Teslim Balogun (1927–1972), Nigerian football player and coach 
Zainab Balogun (born 1989), Nigerian actress, model and television presenter
Wizkid (real name Ayodeji Ibrahim Balogun) (born 1990), Nigerian singer and songwriter

References

Yoruba-language surnames